In computer science and graph theory, the term color-coding refers to an algorithmic technique which is useful in the discovery of network motifs. For example, it can be used to detect a simple path of length  in a given graph. The traditional color-coding algorithm is probabilistic, but it can be derandomized without much overhead in the running time. 

Color-coding also applies to the detection of cycles of a given length, and more generally it applies to the subgraph isomorphism problem (an NP-complete problem), where it yields polynomial time algorithms when the subgraph pattern that it is trying to detect has bounded  treewidth.

The color-coding method was proposed and analyzed in 1994 by Noga Alon, Raphael Yuster, and Uri Zwick.

Results
The following results can be obtained through the method of color-coding:

 For every fixed constant , if a graph  contains a simple cycle of size , then such a cycle can be found in:
  expected time, or
  worst-case time, where  is the exponent of matrix multiplication.
 For every fixed constant , and every graph  that is in any nontrivial minor-closed graph family (e.g., a planar graph), if  contains a simple cycle of size , then such cycle can be found in:
  expected time, or
  worst-case time.
 If a graph  contains a subgraph isomorphic to a bounded treewidth graph which has  vertices, then such a subgraph can be found in polynomial time.

The method
Here, a graph is colorful if every vertex in it is colored with a distinct color. This method works by repeating (1) random coloring a graph and (2) finding colorful copy of the target subgraph, and eventually the target subgraph can be found if the process is repeated a sufficient number of times.

It immediately follows that if the random coloring is repeated  times, then this copy is expected to become colorful once. Note that though  is small, it is shown that if ,  is only polynomially small.

Sometimes it is also desirable to use a more restricted version of colorfulness. For example, in the context of finding cycles in planar graphs, it is possible to develop an algorithm that finds well-colored cycles. Here, a cycle is well-colored if its vertices are colored by consecutive colors.

Example
An example would be finding a simple cycle of length  in graph .

Then an algorithm (described next) can be used to find colorful cycles in the randomly colored graph  in time , where  is the matrix multiplication constant.

The colorful cycle-finding algorithm works by first finding all pairs of vertices in  that are connected by a simple path of length , and then checking whether the two vertices in each pair are connected. Given a coloring function  to color graph , enumerate all partitions of the color set  into two subsets  of size  each. Although this algorithm finds only the end points of the colorful path, another algorithm by Alon and Naor that finds colorful paths themselves can be incorporated into it.

Derandomization
The derandomization of color-coding involves enumerating possible colorings of a graph , such that the randomness of coloring  is no longer required. By definition,  is -perfect if for every subset  of  where , there exists a hash function  in  such that  is perfect. In other words, there must exist a hash function in  that colors any given  vertices with  distinct colors.

There are several approaches to construct such a -perfect hash family:

 The best explicit construction is by Moni Naor, Leonard J. Schulman, and Aravind Srinivasan, where a family of size  can be obtained. This construction does not require the target subgraph to exist in the original subgraph finding problem.
 Another explicit construction by Jeanette P. Schmidt and Alan Siegel yields a family of size .
In the second step, it has been shown by Jeanette P. Schmidt and Alan Siegel that the size of such -perfect family can be .

In particular, it is done by using  random bits that are almost  independent, and the size of the resulting -perfect family will be .

The derandomization of color-coding method can be easily parallelized, yielding efficient NC algorithms.

Applications
Recently, color-coding has attracted much attention in the field of bioinformatics. One example is the detection of signaling pathways in protein-protein interaction (PPI) networks. Another example is to discover and to count the number of motifs in PPI networks. Studying both signaling pathways and motifs allows a deeper understanding of the similarities and differences of many biological functions, processes, and structures among organisms.

Due to the huge amount of gene data that can be collected, searching for pathways or motifs can be highly time consuming. However, by exploiting the color-coding method, the motifs or signaling pathways with  vertices in a network  with  vertices can be found very efficiently in polynomial time. Thus, this enables us to explore more complex or larger structures in PPI networks.

Further reading

References

Graph algorithms